Russia competed at the 2017 World Aquatics Championships in Budapest, Hungary from 14 July to 30 July.

Medalists

Diving

Russia has entered 12 divers (six male and six female).

Men

Women

Mixed

High diving

Russia qualified three male high divers.

Open water swimming

Russia has entered eight open water swimmers

Swimming

Russian swimmers have achieved qualifying standards in the following events (up to a maximum of 2 swimmers in each event at the A-standard entry time, and 1 at the B-standard):

Men

* Zanko tied for sixteenth place, but lost in a three-way swim-off to Slovenia's Peter John Stevens and did not advance.

Women

Mixed

Synchronized swimming

Russia's synchronized swimming team consisted of 14 athletes (1 male and 13 female).

Women

Mixed

 Legend: (R) = Reserve Athlete

Water polo

Men's tournament

Team roster

Vitaly Statsenko
Nikolay Lazarev
Egor Yasilyev
Nikita Dereviankin
Alexey Bugaychuk
Artem Ashaev
Daniil Merjulov
Ivan Nagaev
Ivan Suchkov
Dmitrii Kholod
Sergey Lisunov
Roman Shepelev
Victor Ivanov

Group play

Playoffs

Quarterfinals

5th–8th place semifinals

Seventh place game

Women's tournament

Team roster

Anastasia Verkhoglyadova
Veronika Vakhitova
Ekaterina Prokofyeva
Elvina Karimova
Maria Borisova
Olga Gorbunova
Alena Serzhantova
Anastasia Simanovich
Anna Timofeeva
Tatiana Tolkunova
Evgeniya Ivanova
Daria Ryzhkova
Anna Karnaukh

Group play

Playoffs

Quarterfinals

Semifinals

Third place game

References

Nations at the 2017 World Aquatics Championships
Russia at the World Aquatics Championships
2017 in Russian sport